Live is a live album from Paul Baloche. Integrity Music released the album on April 1, 2014.

Critical reception

Awarding the album three stars at CCM Magazine, Grace Aspinwall states, "not as creative; but, overall, the project is uplifting and the recording is clear and wellarranged." Amanda Furbeck, giving the album five stars from Worship Leader, writes, "this album reveals the beauty and authenticity of a worshipping congregation." Rating the album four stars by New Release Today, Kevin Davis says, "you need to add Live to your worship music collection." Jonathan Andre, signaling in a three and a half star review for 365 Days of Inspiring Media, describes, "Paul still delivers a powerful set list, and one that’ll always showcase some of the most underrated songs within CCM worship industry right now." Indicating in a five star review at Christian Music Review, Jay Heilman replies, "Live...further cements himself in the upper echelon of worship artists whose sole aim is to worship alongside us lifting up the name of Christ." Jono Davies, assigning the album four and a half stars from Louder Than the Music, responds, "the heart of the album is all about pointing the listener to Jesus, and these songs do that with style, passion and heartfelt singing." Allocating a four star review for the album from The Christian Music Review Blog, recognizes, "it's a good album...Might have been better as an EP – strip it down to the best 5 songs, because several of them start to blend together too much."

Awards and accolades
This album was No. 6 on the Worship Leader'''s Top 20 Albums of 2014 list.

The song, "You Lift Us Up", was No. 7 on the Worship Leaders Top 20 Songs of 2014 list.

Track listing

 Personnel 
 Musicians 
 Paul Baloche – lead vocals, acoustic guitar 
 Chris Springer – keyboards, organ
 Brad Towes – keyboards, organ 
 Michael Rossback – keyboards, guitars, electric bass, backing vocals 
 Ben Gowell – electric guitars
 Carl Albrecht – drums, percussion
 Silvia Buttiglione – cello 
 Mary Lindsey – cello 
 Heather Land – backing vocals 
 Brooke Williams – backing vocals
 Joel Auge – guest vocals
 Harvest Bible Chapel Choir – choir
 Joshua Seller – choir director 
 Jen Cole, Erica D., Ruth Dowdell, Jameson Everden, David Jacob, Dan McCaulay, Melody McKay, Bahy Mehany, Joshua Seller, Greg Sykes and Christophe Vacher – additional vocals 

 Production 
 C. Ryan Denham – executive producer
 Michael Rossback – producer, engineer, mixing 
 Jeoff Harris – engineer 
 Darryl Kingdon – assistant engineer 
 Steve Pauls – choir engineer 
 Andrew Mendelson – mastering at Georgetown Masters (Nashville, Tennessee)
 Becca Nicolson – production coordinator 
 Thom Hoyman – art direction, design 
 Jeff Andrews – photography Stage and Technical credits'''
 Frank Dejong – event coordinator, administrator 
 Matt Browning – post-production, video editing, authoring
 John Willis – FOH engineer 
 Steve Pauls – lighting director 
 Natasha Boshoff, Arley McBlain, Kent McGilvary and Priscilla Yuen – cameramen

References

2014 live albums
Paul Baloche albums